The Church of the Holy Cross (Episcopal), which housed St. Mark's until 1954, is a historic church at 875 Cotton Street in Shreveport, Louisiana, United States.  The first services of the Episcopal church in Shreveport were celebrated by the Rt. Rev. Leonidas Polk, the Bishop of Louisiana in March 1839.  That liturgy is considered the founding day of St. Mark's Church.  Prior to this church building, the church was located on Fannin Street.  St. Mark's moved into a new church building at Fairfield Avenue and Rutherford Street in 1954.  That church became the cathedral of the Diocese of Western Louisiana on July 7, 1990.

Holy Cross was formed because a group of Episcopalians from St. Mark's felt that the Church should maintain a presence in the inner city. It owns and operates a number of ministries around Shreveport, but most notably it runs Holy Cross Hope House. Hope House is a day shelter down the street for homeless people.

Holy Cross is also known for its progressive attitude toward social issues. It is one of the few churches in North Louisiana that will marry gay couples. It is also known for its traditional worship style. It had an E.M. Skinner organ built in 1920, another large Aeolian-Skinner organ was ordered in 1956.

The current rector is the Reverend Garrett Boyte, M.Div.

Holy Cross has been served by the Reverend Mary Richard (2008-2019), and the Reverend Kenneth W. Paul (1968-2008).

The church was added to the National Register of Historic Places in 1991.

See also
National Register of Historic Places listings in Caddo Parish, Louisiana

References

External links
The Website for Holy Cross

Episcopal church buildings in Louisiana
Churches on the National Register of Historic Places in Louisiana
Gothic Revival church buildings in Louisiana
Religious organizations established in 1839
Churches completed in 1905
Churches in Shreveport, Louisiana
National Register of Historic Places in Caddo Parish, Louisiana
Individually listed contributing properties to historic districts on the National Register in Louisiana
1839 establishments in Louisiana